The second season of Teen Wolf, an American supernatural drama created by Jeff Davis based upon the 1985 film of the same name, premiered on June 3, 2012, and concluded on August 13, 2012, on the MTV network. The season featured 12 episodes.

Plot
Scott McCall (Tyler Posey) and Allison Argent (Crystal Reed) conceal their renewed relationship from Allison's parents, who oppose it because they know Scott is a werewolf. Lydia Martin (Holland Roden) suffers chronic hallucinations since bitten by Peter Hale (Ian Bohen), now dead because Derek Hale (Tyler Hoechlin) killed him to become the new Alpha werewolf. Derek recruits abused teen Isaac Lahey (Daniel Sharman) into his pack. Jackson Whittemore (Colton Haynes), bitten by Derek Hale at the end of Season 1, shows signs of rejecting Derek's bite, but the reason is a mystery. As Allison's grandfather Gerard Argent (Michael Hogan) comes to town for his daughter Kate Argent's (Jill Wagner) funeral, he decides to avenge her death by declaring war against all werewolves, innocent or not.

Isaac discovers his abusive father was killed by a strange creature. To keep close watch over Allison, Gerard replaces the Beacon Hills High principal and Allison's mother Victoria Argent (Eaddy Mays) becomes a substitute teacher. Lydia's hallucinations center on a mysterious young boy at the school. Derek recruits epileptic loner Erica Reyes (Gage Golightly) and a lonely Boyd (Sinqua Walls) to his pack. Derek discovers the unknown creature who killed Isaac's father is a Kanima, a lizard-like shape shifter created by a mutation in lycanthropy.

Jackson is revealed to be the Kanima, controlled by an unknown master who can make it kill or otherwise harm on orders. Lydia discovers that the Mysterious Young Boy (Michael Fjordbak) she hallucinated about does not exist and is actually a younger Peter Hale. Although dead, Peter is able to use her to lure Derek to him at the old Hale house in order to become resurrected. To save Scott from danger after Victoria Argent learns Scott and Allison are still together, Derek ends up biting Victoria, who commits suicide before she turns into a werewolf. Blaming Derek for his daughter's death, Gerard manipulates Allison's grief over her dead mother, making Allison become a ruthless hunter.

The Kanima's master is revealed to be Matt Daehler (Stephen Lunsford), one of Jackson's high school friends. Matt uses the Kanima/Jackson to seek vengeance against the people who left him, with no swimming ability, to nearly drown years ago at a swim team pool party held by Isaac's swim coach father. Because of the connection between the Kanima and his master, Jackson discovers he now fears water. Held hostage by Matt at a local police station, Scott, Stiles, their parents, and Derek are able to escape, although Scott transforms for the first time in front of his mother, Melissa McCall (Melissa Ponzio), leaving her horrified.

Gerard drowns Matt and becomes the Kanima/Jackson's new master. Derek learns from Peter that the Kanima's weakness is the love interest of its human form, in this case Lydia. Jackson is hospitalized whilst developing a new stage of the Kanima, whereby he ends up in the hands of his former friends. Boyd and Erica try to flee from Derek for their own safety, but are captured and tortured by hunters. Realizing his father, Gerard, corrupted his daughter Allison, Chris Argent (JR Bourne) helps Scott and his allies stop the Kanima from evolving. Gerard tries to confront the group by forcing Derek to bite him and cure his cancer, but Scott reveals he switched his medication with mountain ash. Gerard's body rejects the bite and he quickly disappears. Before the Kanima/Jackson can kill Allison, Lydia reaches out to him and saves him with her love. He evolves in to a new werewolf, as the Kanima is now dead.

Feeling guilty over her grandfather and his influence over her, Allison breaks up with Scott but she promises to come back. While Erica and Boyd are leaving Beacon Hills, they encounter a pack of menacing Alphas. Peter and Derek reveal to Isaac that Derek was building a pack to combat the impending Alpha Pack and Peter knows that they have arrived.

Also appearing during the season are Dr. Deaton (Seth Gilliam), Adrian Harris (Adam Fristoe), Coach Bobby Finstock (Orny Adams), Sheriff Stilinski (Linden Ashby), Danny Mahealani (Keahu Kahuanui), Marin Morrell (Bianca Lawson) and Mr. Lahey (John Wesley Shipp).

Kali, Ennis, Ethan and Aiden make a brief appearance in the season finale, "Master Plan", as the members of the Alpha Pack that kidnapped Boyd and Erica. As of Season 3, they become recurring characters, with their leader Deucalion introduced in "Tattoo", the first episode. These characters are played by Gideon Emery (Deucalion), Brian Patrick Wade (Ennis), Felisha Terrell (Kali), Charlie Carver (Ethan) and Max Carver (Aiden).

Cast

Main
 Tyler Posey as Scott McCall 
 Crystal Reed as Allison Argent 
 Dylan O'Brien as Stiles Stilinski 
 Tyler Hoechlin as Derek Hale
 Holland Roden as Lydia Martin
 Colton Haynes as Jackson Whittemore

Recurring

Episodes

Production
Shooting of season two began in early December 2011 and finished in late April 2012. The second season premiered after the 2012 MTV Movie Awards on June 3, 2012, and will follow the same airing schedule as the first season.

Michael Hogan has been cast as Allison's grandfather, Gerard, a lethal werewolf hunter who attempts to convince her to join the family business and aims to avenge his daughter's murder by killing all werewolves. Stephen Lunsford has been cast as Matt, a teenager with an eye for photography who has taken a stalkerish liking towards Allison. Daniel Sharman has been cast as Isaac Lahey, a troubled teen and member of the lacrosse team who is the first to join Derek's pack. Gage Golightly has been cast as Erica Reyes, the first female werewolf in Derek's pack. Sinqua Walls has been cast as Boyd, the third and final member of Derek's pack.

Reception
The review aggregator website Rotten Tomatoes reported an approval rating of 90% and an average rating of 7.84/10 for the second season, based on 10 reviews. The website's critics consensus reads, "This lupine romp gains swagger in its sophomore outing, nailing an addictive mix of soapy melodrama and horror thrills."

Awards and nominations

Home media
The second season was released on DVD in the United States on May 21, 2013.

Reference list

2012 American television seasons
Teen Wolf (2011 TV series)